Maksymilian Sitek (born 4 December 2000) is a Polish professional footballer who mainly plays as a winger for I liga side Podbeskidzie Bielsko-Biała.

Career statistics

References

External links

2000 births
People from Rzeszów
Living people
Polish footballers
Poland under-21 international footballers
Association football midfielders
Siarka Tarnobrzeg players
Puszcza Niepołomice players
Podbeskidzie Bielsko-Biała players
Stal Mielec players
Ekstraklasa players
I liga players
II liga players